Befaam is a 2021 Indian Marathi-language film directed by Krishna Kamble and produced by Amol Kagne.film Available on Zee5

Cast 
 Mahadev Abhyankar
 Siddharth Chandekar
 Seema Deshmukh
 Sakhi Gokhale
 Vidyadhar Joshi
 Nachiket Purnapatre
 Kamlesh Sawant
 Shashank Shende.

Reception
The Times of India said, "Overall Befaam touches a chord by highlighting the plight of 10th and 12th grade students when they have to make a career choice. The unique way of presenting this fact, makes it a decent watch."

References

External links 
 

2020s Marathi-language films